Ahmed Ramadan Dumbuya is a former Sierra Leonean politician. Dumbuya served as foreign minister twice; for a brief time in 1992  and from 2001 to 2002. He is a member of the Susu ethnic group.

References 

Living people
Sierra Leonean Muslims
Year of birth missing (living people)
Foreign Ministers of Sierra Leone
Sierra Leonean diplomats
Susu people